Andrew James Baildon (born 25 August 1971) is an Australian former freestyle and butterfly swimming champion, who represented Australia in the 1988 Summer Olympics in Seoul and the 1992 Summer Olympics in Barcelona.

Early life and family 
Andrew was born on 25 August 1971, on the Gold Coast, Australia. His father, Gary Baildon AM, was Mayor of the City of Gold Coast from 1997 to 2004, has been awarded Knight of Grace (Order of St John), Doctor of the University (Griffith 2005), The Centenary Medal, The 1995 Australian Tourism Council Award, Paul Harris Fellow (Rotary International), in 2010 Gary was made a Member of the Order of Australia (AM), is the 2016 Gold Coast Citizen of the Year and returned to local government in 2016 as a Gold Coast Councillor.

Andrew has 2 sisters, Kate (deceased) and Anna.

At the age of two, Andrew sank to the bottom of his family's pool and nearly drowned. His older sister, Kate, saved him and his mother, Kathy, promptly booked him into swimming lessons five days a week and so began his swimming career.

Andrew studied at The Southport School (TSS) from 1979 to 1988, was the Kaiser House Captain and School Foundation Prefect, attained TSS Sporting Colours in Year 9 and became Cadet Under Officer in the TSS Cadets.

As a 16-year-old schoolboy, Andrew was the youngest male selected to represent his country at an Olympics (Seoul 1988) since Australian swimming great Michael Wenden (dual Olympic Swimming Gold Medallist, World Record Holder and Commonwealth Champion). As well as equalling Wenden's record of four gold medals at a single Commonwealth Games, Andrew became his son-in-law when he married Karen Wenden (1989 Miss Universe Miss Photogenic, Queensland state level swimming champion) at The Southport School (TSS) in 1998.

Andrew was a Foundation Student at Bond University from 1989 to 1995, attaining a Bachelor in Communication (Marketing).

Andrew and Karen have two children, a daughter, model Yasmin, and son, Flynn, a national level competitive swimmer.

Career 
Andrew was a medalist at the 1990 Commonwealth Games in Auckland, New Zealand where he became the first swimmer in the Commonwealth to break the 50-second barrier for the 100 m freestyle, when he smashed his own Commonwealth record to win gold (49.80s), and the 1994 Commonwealth Games in Victoria, Canada. He was a medalist in the 4 Pan Pacific Swimming Championships.

In 1990, Andrew achieved the No. 1 World ranking for 100 m Butterfly (Short Course).

Andrew was the Australian Team Representative for over a decade, an Australian record holder for the 50 and 100-metre freestyle from 1989–1996 and the Commonwealth record holder for most of that period. He was ranked in the top twenty swimmers in the world for over a decade.

Representing Australia 
Andrew was the Australian Team Captain in 1993 and 1994 (when Australia achieved one of its best pool Commonwealth Games performances in Canada) and the Australian Team Representative for over a decade.

Andrew was awarded the Australian Sports Medal for this service to sport.

2018 Gold Coast Commonwealth Games:
 Ambassador, Commonwealth Games Bid in St Kits & Nevis, instrumental in successfully bringing the 2018 Commonwealth Games to the Gold Coast, 2016
 Member of the Sport & Technical Committee
 Chairman of the Athletes Advisory Board
 Australian Commonwealth Games Team Attaché
 Member of the Queensland State Government's Legacy Committee

Australian Swimming 
Board Member:
 Australian Swimming, 2018 (current)
 Australian Sports Foundation, 2018 (current)
 ASCTA, 2018

Guest Speaker:
 ASCTA Swim Conference, 2018
 National Australian Swim Conference, 2009

Australian Government – Australian Sports Foundation Limited 
Board Member, 2018 (current)

Television 
FOX Sport Swimming Commentator: 2000 Olympic Swimming Trials
Channel 7 Expert Swimming Commentator: 2000 Sydney Olympic Games

Honours 
Australian Sports Medal June 2000
Sydney 2000 Olympic Torchbearer with his father Gary Baildon AM. Andrew was invited to light the Cauldron for the Gold Coast.
2006 Commonwealth Games Baton Relay, Melbourne
2018 Commonwealth Games Queens Baton Relay, Gold Coast
2018 Invited to "A Celebration of the Commonwealth" at Buckingham Palace, in the presence of the Queen and other members of the royal family.
2018 Awarded the Keys to The City of Brisbane with the Australian Commonwealth Games Team, 2018

Business 
Andrew and his wife Karen operate Baildon Group, encompassing
 Andrew Baildon's Superfish Swim Schools, Brisbane and Gold Coast, specialising in "Learn to Swim" and Drowning Prevention programs.
 Jetts Fitness Coomera
 Jetts Fitness Pacific Pines
 Jetts Fitness Pimpama
 Opened the inaugural Andrew Baildon Aquatic Centre on the Gold Coast in 1996 with wife Karen (daughter of swimming great Michael Wenden) teaching over 1000 children per week in the first year.
 Bachelor of Business, Communication (Marketing), Bond University, 1989–1995 (Foundation Student)

Awards 
 South-East Queensland Business Achievers Award for Sport and Recreation, 2006
 Swim Australia Best Swim School for Marketing, Promotion and Customer Service, 2017

See also 
 List of Commonwealth Games medallists in swimming (men)

References

External links 
 Andrew Baildon's Superfish Swim Schools
 Andrew Baildon's Superfish Swim Club
 Profile on Gold Coast Sporting Hall of Fame

1971 births
Living people
Olympic swimmers of Australia
Australian male butterfly swimmers
Swimmers at the 1988 Summer Olympics
Swimmers at the 1990 Commonwealth Games
Swimmers at the 1992 Summer Olympics
Swimmers at the 1994 Commonwealth Games
Sportspeople from the Gold Coast, Queensland
Commonwealth Games gold medallists for Australia
Recipients of the Australian Sports Medal
Commonwealth Games bronze medallists for Australia
Commonwealth Games medallists in swimming
Australian male freestyle swimmers
Medallists at the 1990 Commonwealth Games
Medallists at the 1994 Commonwealth Games